Kampong Lpov is a khum (commune) of Samlout District in Battambang Province in north-western Cambodia.

Villages

 Svay Chrum
 Ou Daem Chek
 Kampong Lpov
 Ou Choam Kandal
 Ou Choam Kraom
 Ou Choam Leu
 Kandal
 Stueng Touch
 Prey Thum

References

Communes of Battambang province
Samlout District